Law and Order may refer to:

In politics
Law and order (politics), a term common in political debate and discussion, generally indicating support of a strict criminal justice system
Law and Order Offensive Party, a former minor German political party
Operation Law and Order, an Israeli military operation against a Hezbollah base in Lebanon
Law and Order (Latvia), a minor right-wing Latvian political party

In entertainment and media

In film
Law and Order (1932 film), western
Law and Order (1940 film), western
Law and Order (1942 film), Billy the Kid western
Law and Order (1953 film), western
Law and Order (1969 film), documentary
Exiled: A Law & Order Movie (1998 film), drama

In television
Law & Order (franchise) (1990–present), a number of related police and legal dramas created by Dick Wolf for NBC television
Law & Order (1990–2010, 2022–present), the first series in the franchise
Law & Order: Special Victims Unit (1999–present), the second series in the franchise
Law & Order: Criminal Intent (2001–2011), the third series in the franchise
Law & Order: Trial by Jury (2005–2006), the fourth series in the franchise
Law & Order: UK (2009–2014), a British adaptation of the original series
Law & Order: LA (2010–2011), the fifth (US) series in the franchise
Law & Order True Crime (2017), the sixth US series in the franchise
Law & Order: Organized Crime (2021–present), the seventh US series in the franchise
Law & Order (British TV series), 1978 series of four police and legal television plays
"Law and Order", an episode of the 1975 TV series Survivors

In music
Law and Order (album), by Lindsey Buckingham
 "Law & Order" (song), a song by the Tom Robinson Band on the 1979 album TRB Two
"Law & Order", the theme to the Law & Order franchise (see below), a song by Mike Post from the 1994 album Inventions from the Blue Line

In video games
Law & Order: Dead on the Money
Law & Order: Double or Nothing
Law & Order: Justice Is Served
Law & Order: Criminal Intent (video game)
Law & Order: Legacies

In other uses
Law & Order (G.I. Joe), a fictional K-9 team in the G.I. Joe universe
Law and Order, 1973 NYC police novel by Dorothy Uhnak which became a TV-movie starring Darren McGavin

See also 

 Crime and Punishment
Crime and Punishment (disambiguation)